Suriya is an Indian actor, producer as well as a television host. He made his film debut in Nerrukku Ner (1997), which won him the Cinema Express Award for Best New Face Actor and the Dinakaran Award for Best New Face Actor. He won Tamil Nadu State Film Award for Best Actor in 2002 for the film Nandha, which was the major break in his career. He won his first Filmfare Award, for Best Supporting Actor for the film Pithamagan (2003). Suriya was nominated seventeen times and won six Filmfare Awards South, including three for Best Actor. At Vijay Awards, he was nominated fourteen times and won five. In 2010, he was awarded as Best Welfare Provider by Vijay TV for his contribution through Agaram Foundation. He won his first National Film Award, for Best Actor, for Soorarai Pottru in 2022.

National Film Awards

Tamil Nadu State Film Awards 
The Tamil Nadu State Film Awards are the most notable film awards given for Tamil films in India. They are given annually to honour the best talents and provide encouragement and incentive to the South Indian film industry by the Government of Tamil Nadu.

Kalaimamani Awards 
The Kalaimamani is an award in Tamil Nadu state, India. These awards are given by the Tamil Nadu Iyal Isai Nataka Manram (literature, music and theatre) for excellence in the field of art and literature.

Chennai Times Film Awards 
The Chennai Times Film Awards presented by The Times of India to celebrates the best in the Tamil film industry.

CineMAA Awards 
The CineMAA Awards are presented annually by Movie Artists Association Group, a television network based in Hyderabad.

Cinema Express Awards
The Cinema Express Awards are presented annually by Indian Express Group to honour artistic excellence of professionals in the south Indian film industry which comprises Tamil, Telugu, Kannada and Malayalam film industries.

Edison Awards 
The Edison Awards have been presented by the Tamil television channel MyTamilMovie.com since 2009 to honour excellence in Tamil cinema.

Filmfare Awards South 
The Filmfare Awards South is the South Indian segment of the annual Filmfare Awards, presented by The Times Group to honour both artistic and technical excellence of professionals in the South Indian film industry. The awards are separately given for Kannada, Tamil, Telugu and Malayalam films.

International Tamil Film Awards 
The International Tamil Film Awards (ITFA) is an award ceremony that honours artistic excellence in Tamil films. The awards were first presented in 2003.

Screen Awards 
The Screen Awards are presented annually by Indian Express Limited to honour excellence in Hindi cinema.

South Indian International Movie Awards 
The South Indian International Movie Awards are rewards the artistic and technical achievements of the South Indian film industry.

Stardust Awards 
The Stardust Awards, given by Stardust movie magazine began in 2003. They celebrate new talent in the movie industry as well as honouring current stars.

Vijay Awards 
The Vijay Awards have been presented by the Tamil television channel STAR Vijay since 2006 to honour excellence in Tamil cinema.

Other awards and recognition

Notes

References 

Lists of awards received by Indian actor